Alperen Acet (born 2 April 1998) is a Turkish athlete specialising in the high jump. He finished fifth at the 2018 European Championships.

His personal bests in the event are 2.30 metres outdoors (Cluj-Napoca 2018 – current national record) and 2.16 metres indoors (Belgrade 2017). He won the silver medal at the 2019 Summer Universiade held in Naples, Italy jumping 2.24 m.

International competitions

References

1998 births
Living people
Turkish male high jumpers
People from Nazilli
Athletes (track and field) at the 2014 Summer Youth Olympics
Universiade medalists in athletics (track and field)
Universiade silver medalists for Turkey
Medalists at the 2019 Summer Universiade
European Games competitors for Turkey
Athletes (track and field) at the 2019 European Games
Athletes (track and field) at the 2022 Mediterranean Games
21st-century Turkish people